Sugar Valley is an unincorporated community in Preble County, in the U.S. state of Ohio.

History
Sugar Valley was laid out and platted in 1849. The Sugar Valley post office was discontinued in 1902.

References

Unincorporated communities in Preble County, Ohio
Unincorporated communities in Ohio